Subroto Roy may refer to:

 Subroto Roy (economist)
 Subrata Roy, Founder and Chairman of the Sahara India Pariwar